Sri RamaKrishna Education Society, Bangalore is a school established in 1963. It is located in Halasuru of Bangalore, Karnataka, India. This school has classes starting from pre-kg till 10th grade. The school was founded by Sri S. Muniraju.

The school is run by Mr. M. Amoghavarsha. 

Schools in Bangalore